North Carolina's 6th congressional district is located in north central portion of the state. As a result of court-mandated redistricting in 2019, it was shifted into the central Triad region and contains all of Guilford County and a portion of Forsyth County. The cities of Greensboro, Winston-Salem, and High Point are located in the district.

After congressional reapportionment following the 2010 census, the district was shifted northward by the North Carolina General Assembly. From then until 2017, it included portions of Guilford, Alamance, Durham, Granville, and Orange counties, and all of Caswell, Person, Rockingham, Surry, and Stokes counties. In 2015, it was reconfigured again but remained in the same general region.

The district was represented by Mark Walker, a Republican until 2021. He held the position from 2015. In December 2019, Walker announced that he would not run for re-election in 2020. It is currently represented by Democrat Kathy Manning.

History
From 2003 to 2013 the 6th district comprised all of Moore and Randolph counties and portions of Alamance, Davidson, Guilford, and Rowan counties. Until court-mandated redistricting in 2019, the district included the entirety of Alamance County, Caswell County, Chatham County, Lee County, Person County, Randolph County, and, Rockingham County, as well as portions of Guilford County.

Prior to 2022 redistricting the 6th district included all of Guilford County and part of Forsyth.

On February 23, 2022, the North Carolina Supreme Court approved a new map which changed the 6th district boundaries to also include Caswell and Rockingham Counties.

Counties 
Counties in the 2023-2025 district map.
 Caswell County (part)
 Forsyth County (part)
 Guilford County
 Rockingham County

List of members representing the district

Recent election results

2012

2014

2016

2018

2020

2022

See also

 North Carolina's congressional districts
 List of United States congressional districts

Notes

References

Further reading

 Congressional Biographical Directory of the United States 1774–present

NC-6